Graphic MSP is a series of graphic novels published by Panini Comics based on the characters of Monica's Gang.

Development
In November 2011, during the Festival Internacional de Quadrinhos held in Belo Horizonte, Sidney Gusman, editor of Mauricio de Sousa Produções (Monica's Gang studio) announced that in 2012, it would be released the Graphic MSP, a series of graphic novels, that unlike the MSP 50 series, it would bring unique stories in about 72 pages each. The comic artist Danilo Beyruth was chosen to create a story for the Bubbly, in 2009, Beyruth had already written and drawn characters of Mauricio de Sousa for the MSP+50 album and produced a story for Bug-a-Booo. In October 2012, is released the first graphic novel of the series, entitled Astronauta - Magnetar, with script and drawings by Beyruth and colors by Cris Peter.

Publications

References

Monica's Gang
Brazilian graphic novels